Leionema praetermissum, is a shrub with warty stems covered in hairs, white flowers with spreading petals, and prominent stamens. It has a restricted distribution in New South Wales.

Description
The stems are warty and needle-shaped with occasional white star-shaped hairs. The triangular, narrow calyx lobes are smooth on the outside with a stiff apex. Flowering occurs from April to July.

Taxonomy and naming
Leionema praetermissum was first formally described by Phillipa Alvarez and Marco Duretto in 2019 and the description was published in the journal Telopea. The specific epithet (praetermissum) is in reference to "this species having been identified as an undescribed taxon for at least three decades before being formally described".

Distribution and habitat
This species has a restricted distribution, it grows in wetlands adjacent to water courses in sand, amongst boulders in vegetation thickets along the Colo River in the Wollemi National Park in New South Wales.

References

praetermissum
Sapindales of Australia
Flora of New South Wales
Plants described in 2019
Taxa named by Marco Duretto